Sri Lanka participated in the 2014 Asian Beach Games in Phuket, Thailand from 14 to 23 November 2014.

Medal summary

Medal by sport

Medal by Date

External links 
Official Site

References 

Nations at the 2014 Asian Beach Games
2014
Asian Beach Games